Minuscule 299 (in the Gregory-Aland numbering), A21 (Soden), is a Greek minuscule manuscript of the New Testament, on parchment. Palaeographically it has been assigned to the 10th century. 
It has marginalia.

Description 

The codex contains a complete text of the four Gospels on 328 parchment leaves. The text is written in one column per page, in 24 lines per page.

There is also another division according to the smaller Ammonian Sections (in Mark 240, 16:8), with references to the Eusebian Canons.

It contains the Epistula ad Carpianum, Prolegomena, the Eusebian tables, Synaxarion, Menologion, subscriptions at the end of each Gospel, and pictures. 
The biblical text is surrounded by a commentary (Mark – Victorinus).

Text 

The Greek text of the codex is a mixture of text-types. Kurt Aland did not place it in any Category.

It was not examined by using the Claremont Profile Method.

History 

It was added to the list of New Testament manuscripts by Scholz (1794–1852). 
It was examined and described by Paulin Martin. C. R. Gregory saw the manuscript in 1885.

The manuscript is currently housed at the Bibliothèque nationale de France (Suppl. Gr. 177) at Paris.

See also 

 List of New Testament minuscules
 Biblical manuscript
 Textual criticism

References

Further reading 

 

Greek New Testament minuscules
10th-century biblical manuscripts
Bibliothèque nationale de France collections